Justice Henley may refer to:

Fred L. Henley, Judge and chief justice of the Supreme Court of Missouri
George Henley, associate justice of the Supreme Court of Indiana